The battle of Rodosto took place in February 1206 in the town of Rodosto (today Tekirdağ, Turkey) between the Bulgarians led by Emperor Kaloyan and the Crusaders. It resulted in a Bulgarian victory.

After the Bulgarians annihilated the Latin army in the battle of Rusion on 31 January 1206 the remnants of the shattered Crusader forces headed to the coastal town of Rodosto to seek refuge. The town had a strong Venetian garrison and was further supported by a regiment of 2,000 troops from Constantinople. However, the fear of the Bulgarians was so great that the Latins panicked with the very arrival of the Bulgarian soldiers. They were incapable to resist and after a short battle the Venetians began to flee to their ships in the port. In their haste to escape many boats were overloaded and sank and most Venetians drowned. The town was looted by the Bulgarians who continued their victorious march through eastern Thrace and captured many more towns and fortresses.

References

1206 in Europe
Battles involving the Second Bulgarian Empire
Battles involving the Latin Empire
13th century in Bulgaria
Bulgarian–Latin Wars
Conflicts in 1206
History of Tekirdağ